Éric Dall'Armelina (born 15 November 1959) is a French former racing cyclist. He rode in the 1983 Tour de France and the 1984 Vuelta a España.

Major results
1982
 1st Stage 2 Paris–Bourges
 1st Stage 1 Tour de Corse
 4th Paris–Tours
1983
 1st Grand Prix de Mauléon-Moulins
 1st Nice–Alassio
 1st Stage 9 Tour de Suisse
 1st Stage 2b Critérium du Dauphiné Libéré
 1st Stage 3 Tour Européen Lorraine-Alsace
1984
 1st Stage 3a Tour d'Armorique
 2nd Road race, National Road Championships
 4th Grand Prix de Mauléon-Moulins

References

External links
 

1959 births
Living people
French male cyclists
People from Oullins
Sportspeople from Lyon Metropolis
Cyclists from Auvergne-Rhône-Alpes
Tour de Suisse stage winners